is a railway station in the city of  Toyokawa, Aichi Prefecture, Japan, operated by Central Japan Railway Company (JR Tōkai).

Lines
Kozakai Station is served by the Iida Line, and is located 4.4 kilometers from the southern terminus of the line at Toyohashi Station.

Station layout
The station has two opposed side platforms connected by a footbridge. The station building has automated ticket machines, TOICA automated turnstiles and is unattended.

Platforms

Adjacent stations

|-
!colspan=5|Central Japan Railway Company

Station history
On August 1, 1943, the Toyokawa Railway was nationalized along with some other local lines to form the Japanese Government Railways (JGR) Iida Line. Meitetsu ceased operations to Kozakai in 1954. Scheduled freight operations were discontinued in 1971. Along with its division and privatization of JNR on April 1, 1987, the station came under the control and operation of the Central Japan Railway Company (JR Tōkai). A new station building was completed in February 2002.

Station numbering was introduced to the Iida Line in March 2018; Kozakai Station was assigned station number CE03.

Passenger statistics
In fiscal 2017, the station was used by an average of 443 passengers daily.

Surrounding area
 Kozakai High School
 Kozakai Higashi Junior High School

See also
 List of Railway Stations in Japan

References

External links

Railway stations in Japan opened in 1898
Railway stations in Aichi Prefecture
Iida Line
Stations of Central Japan Railway Company
Toyokawa, Aichi